The 36 locomotives of Class P 3/5 N of the Royal Bavarian State Railways (Königlich Bayerische Staatsbahn) were built between 1905 and 1907 by Maffei. The P 3/5 N evolved from the S 3/5 express train locomotive and had likewise a four-cylinder compound configuration. Compared with the S 3/5 the P 3/5 N had a smaller boiler but the same size cylinders. The P 3/5 N could haul a 350-ton train at 80 km/h on the level.

Six locomotives were destroyed in World War I; 17 more had to be handed over as reparations. The remaining 13 locomotives were taken over by the Deutsche Reichsbahn as Class 38.0.

The S 3/6 had already displaced these locomotives from the higher value passenger services.

Following positive experience with the Class P 3/5 H, the later DRG Class 38.4, in 1921, all P 3/5 N were converted from saturated to superheated steam operation between 1924 and 1925. The vehicles were nevertheless retired between 1932 and; the last locomotive in service was the 38 003.

The engines were equipped with Bavarian 2′2′ T 18,2 tenders.

See also 
 Royal Bavarian State Railways
 List of Bavarian locomotives and railbuses

References

External links 
 Railways of Germany forum

4-6-0 locomotives
P 3 5 N
Standard gauge locomotives of Germany
Maffei locomotives
Railway locomotives introduced in 1905
2′C n4v locomotives
Passenger locomotives

pl:Ok102